Cecil Wilfrid Luscombe "Bill" Bevan, CBE (2 April 1920 – 19 April 1989) was a Welsh chemist, academic, and academic administrator. He was Principal of University College, Cardiff from 1966 to 1987. He was additionally Vice-Chancellor of the University of Wales for two terms: 1973 to 1975 and 1981 to 1983.

Academic career
Bevan worked at the University of Exeter from 1949 to 1953, before moving to the University of Ibadan in Nigeria. He was head of its Department of Chemistry from 1953 and 1966, and its Vice Principal and Deputy Vice-Chancellor from 1960 to 1964.

Honours
In the 1965 New Year Honours, Bevan was appointed a Commander of the Order of the British Empire (CBE). He was made an officer of the Ordre des Palmes Académiques by the government of France in 1986.

In 1969, Bevan was made a Fellow of University College London (UCL); this is an honorary appointment recognising "distinction in the arts, literature, science, business or public life". He was awarded an honorary Doctor of Science (DSc) degree in 1973 by the University of Ibadan. In 1982, he was made an Honorary Fellow of University College, Cardiff.

Selected works

References

1920 births
1989 deaths
Welsh chemists
Vice-Chancellors of the University of Wales
Academics of Cardiff University
Commanders of the Order of the British Empire
Officiers of the Ordre des Palmes Académiques
Academics of the University of Exeter
Academic staff of the University of Ibadan